Jesús Alejandro Gómez Lanza (born July 18, 1979), is a Bolivian of Chilean descent footballer who currently plays for Liga de Fútbol Profesional Boliviano club Sport Boys Warnes as a midfielder.

Club career
At club level he spent most of his career with Blooming. He also played for Wilstermann, San José and Bolívar. He is a central midfielder.

In April 2010, he was awarded by the local sports media as the best football player of the year in Bolivia.

International career
Gómez earned 8 caps in the Bolivia national team, 6 of which were FIFA World Cup qualification matches.

Honours
Blooming
 Primera División (2): 1998, 1999
 Torneo de Clausura (1): 2009

San José
 Torneo de Clausura (1): 2007

Bolívar
 Torneo de Clausura (1): 2013

References

External links
 Jesús Alejandro Gómez at BDFA.com.ar 
 
 
 

1979 births
Living people
Footballers from La Paz
Bolivian people of Chilean descent
Sportspeople of Chilean descent
Bolivian footballers
Bolivia international footballers
Association football midfielders
Club Blooming players
C.D. Jorge Wilstermann players
Club San José players
Club Bolívar players
Sport Boys Warnes players
Nacional Potosí players
Bolivian Primera División players